Crenimugil is a genus of mullets found in coastal marine waters and rivers in the Indo-Pacific region.

Species
Four species are currently recognised as comprising the genus Crenimugil:

 Crenimugil buchanani (Bleeker, 1853) (Bluetail mullet)
 Crenimugil crenilabis (Forsskål, 1775) (Fringelip mullet)
 Crenimugil heterocheilos (Bleeker, 1855) (Half fringelip mullet) 
 Crenimugil pedaraki Valenciennes, 1836 (Longfin mullet)
 Crenimugil seheli (Forsskål, 1775) (Bluespot mullet)

The half-fringelip mullet (Crenimugil heterocheilos), usually assigned to Crenimugil, appears to belong to a separate genus, Paracrenimugil, based on DNA-based cladistic analysis. In addition, the longfin mullet (Crenimugil pedaraki) is listed by some authorities in the separate genus Moolgarda.

References

External links
Crenimugil crenilabis at FishBase
Crenimugil heterocheilos at FishBase